Megalorhipida leptomeres is a moth of the family Pterophoridae. It is known from the Democratic Republic of Congo, Kenya, Tanzania, South Africa, La Réunion, Madagascar, the Seychelles, Oman and Yemen.

References 

Oxyptilini
Moths described in 1886
Moths of Asia
Moths of Africa
Moths of Madagascar
Moths of the Middle East
Moths of Réunion
Moths of Seychelles